Rehimena stictalis is a species of moth of the family Crambidae described by George Hampson in 1908. It is known from Sri Lanka.

The wingspan of this species is 18 mm.

References

Moths described in 1908
Spilomelinae